Russograptis solaris is a species of moth of the family Tortricidae. It is found in Nigeria.

The length of the forewings is about 7 mm. The ground colour of the forewings is cream-grey, darkening towards the base and with an indistinct bluish hue. The costa is cream-orange, the dorsum brown to one-third. There are brown spots along the costa and a subapical marking, as well as an elongate brown fascia extending from beyond the middle of the termen and the terminal blotch. The latter is situated in a large cream field. There is a red pattern which is similar to that of Rutilograptis cornesi, but the median fascia is curved and the two postmedial streaks are smaller, shorter and more oblique. The basal markings consist of three proximal elements followed by an elongate blotch and three similar streaks. The hindwings are yellow-orange, bot brownish anally and more cream towards the base.

References

Endemic fauna of Nigeria
Moths described in 1981
Tortricini
Moths of Africa
Taxa named by Józef Razowski